Danica (Cyrillic: Даница) is a given name. Notable people and characters with the name include:

 Danica Crnogorčević, singer of ethno and religious songs and a graduate art historian from Montenegro
 Danica Krstajić, tennis player from Montenegro
 Danica Lee, American actress, best known for voicing Ming-Ming on Wonder Pets!
 Danica, Hereditary Princess of Serbia, Serbian graphic designer and wife of Hereditary Prince Philip
 Danica McKellar, American actress and mathematician, best known for her role as Winnie Cooper on the TV show The Wonder Years
 Danica Patrick, American race car driver
 Danica Rice, Canadian sprint kayaker
 Danica Roem, American politician and journalist
 Danica Seleskovitch (1921–2001), French conference interpreter, teacher and academic writer
 Danica Thrall, English glamour model and reality television personality
 Danica Wu, Canadian soccer player
 Elvira Dolinar (pen name Danica, 1870–1961), Slovenian feminist writer

Fictional 
 Danica Maupoissant, from the Forgotten Realms fictional world of Dungeons and Dragons
Danica Shardae, the protagonist and narrator of Amelia Atwater-Rhodes's fantasy novel Hawksong
 Danica Talos, a vampire character from the 2004 film Blade: Trinity

See also
 Danika (disambiguation)
 

Serbian feminine given names
Slovene feminine given names
Croatian feminine given names
Macedonian feminine given names
Czech feminine given names
Slovak feminine given names
Bulgarian feminine given names